Concert Classics is a live album by Roxy Music. All tracks were recorded during the group's "Manifesto Tour" at the Rainbow Music Hall, Denver, Colorado on April 12, 1979. The album was released nineteen years later in February, 1998, and released again in 2001 with two extra tracks, under the name Concerto. Roxy Music had no input to this album as it is not an official Roxy Music release but released under license.

Track listing
All tracks by Bryan Ferry except where noted.
 "Manifesto" (Ferry, Phil Manzanera) – 5:39
 "Angel Eyes" (Ferry, Andy MacKay) – 3:57
 "Trash" (Ferry, Manzanera) – 2:54
 "Out of the Blue" (Ferry, Manzanera) – 5:18
 "A Song for Europe" (Ferry, MacKay) – 6:25
 "Still Falls the Rain" (Ferry, Manzanera) – 4:29
 "Ain't that so " (Ferry, Manzanera) – 5:55
 "Stronger Through the Years" – 8:23
 "Ladytron" – 5:29
 "In Every Dreamhome a Heartache" – 9:06
 "Love Is the Drug" (Ferry, MacKay) – 3:50
 "Do the Strand" – 4:08
 "Re-make/Re-model" – 4:05

Personnel
Roxy Music
Bryan Ferry – lead vocals, keyboards
Phil Manzanera – lead guitar
Andy MacKay – saxophones
Paul Thompson – drums
Gary Tibbs – bass
David Skinner – keyboards, piano

Production
Norm Simmer – engineer
Steve Weiner – producer
John W. Edwards – executive producer

References

1998 live albums
Roxy Music live albums